Choctaw is an unincorporated community and census-designated place in Lafourche Parish, Louisiana, United States. Its population was 879 as of the 2010 census.

Geography

Demographics

Education
Choctaw is within Lafourche Parish Public Schools and served by Bayou Boeuf Elementary School, Sixth Ward Middle School, and Thibodaux High School.

References

Unincorporated communities in Lafourche Parish, Louisiana
Unincorporated communities in Louisiana
Census-designated places in Lafourche Parish, Louisiana
Census-designated places in Louisiana